Marion Correctional Institution can refer to:

 Marion Correctional Institution (Florida)
 Marion Correctional Institution (Ohio)